Articles on Handball at the 2012 Summer Olympics include:

 Handball at the 2012 Summer Olympics
 Handball at the 2012 Summer Olympics – Men's qualification
 Handball at the 2012 Summer Olympics – Men's tournament
 Handball at the 2012 Summer Olympics – Women's qualification
 Handball at the 2012 Summer Olympics – Women's tournament